William Dafydd (floruit c. 1597) was a 16th and perhaps 17th century Welsh poet. Little is known about him, one religious carol may be his only surviving work.

References 

Welsh male poets
16th-century Welsh poets
Year of birth unknown
Place of birth unknown
Year of death unknown
Place of death unknown